Toorop is a surname of Dutch origin. People with that name include:

 Charley Toorop (1891-1955), Dutch painter and lithographer, daughter of Jan
 Jan Toorop (1858-1928), Dutch-Indonesian painter, father of Charley
 Linda Toorop (born 1955), Dutch gymnast

See also
 

Surnames of Dutch origin